Qitaihe is a prefecture-level city in eastern Heilongjiang province, China. Covering an area , it is geographically the smallest prefecture-level division of the province. Qitaihe also has the second smallest population of the cities in Heilongjiang. At the 2010 census, its total population was 920,419, while 620,935 live in the built up area made of 3 urban districts.

Administrative divisions

History
Qitaihe's history can be stretched back to 3,000 years ago during the Shang and Zhou Dynasties, when it was inhabited by the ancient Sushen group, the ancestors of the Manchu. In 1910, coal resources was found in Qitaihe. However, coal mining industry did not really start until The CPC Committee of Heilongjiang Province ordered Hegang Mining Bureau to take charge of the Extractive industries in Boli County in 1958. Qitaihe began its development. On Jan 26, 1961, Boli Mining Bureau was established. The CPC Central Committee and State Council approved to establish Qitaihe District as a pilot of the combination of enterprise management and government administration. In 1970, Qitaihe District was changed into Qitaihe City (county-level), which is under the jurisdiction of Jiamusi. In 1983, Qitaihe was designated a Prefecture-level city, and Boli County was put into Qitaihe's jurisdiction.

Geography and climate

Mineral resources
Qitaihe is rich in fresh water and minerals including coal, gold and graphite. There are 26 reservoirs in total. The water storage capacity of the city's Taoshan Reservoir is 264 million steres. Qitaihe has a total coal reserve of 5.3 billion tons, ranking third after Shuangyashan and Jixi in Heilongjiang Province.

Climate
Qitaihe has a monsoon-influenced humid continental climate (Köppen Dwb), with long, bitter, but dry winters, and humid and very warm summers.

Economy
Coal mining is an important industry. Qitaihe is the only pilot city for coal recycling in Heilongjiang. The city's GDP topped RMB 23.35 billion in 2009, featuring a growth of 26% over the previous year. Qitaihe is home to Qitaihe Coal Mining Group and Qitaihe No.1 Power Generation Company.

Transportation
The Tumen-Jiamusi Railway and the Boli-Qitaihe Railway connect the city with Mudanjiang, Jiamusi and other cities in Heilongjiang. Jiamusi Airport, Jixi Airport and Mudanjiang Airport, which offers regular flights to other domestic cities in China, are less than two hours away.

References

External links
 Official site

Cities in Heilongjiang
Prefecture-level divisions of Heilongjiang